Manuel Uribe (1965–2014) was one of the heaviest people in medical history.

Manuel Uribe may also refer to:

Manuel Uribe Ángel (1822–1914), Colombian academic and physician, governor of Antioquia, first curator of the Museum of Antioquia 
Manuel Uribe y Troncoso (1867–1959), Mexican ophthalmologist and founding member of the Colegio Nacional

See also
 Manuel Oribe (1792–1857), Uruguayan politician